The Belleville McFarlands were a Canadian senior ice hockey team in the Ontario Hockey Association (OHA) from 1956 to 1961. The McFarlands were based out of Belleville, Ontario, playing home games at the Belleville Memorial Arena.

History
The McFarlands played in the OHA Senior A League and won the J. Ross Robertson Cup as league champions in 1958. The McFarlands also won the 1958 Allan Cup, defeating the Kelowna Packers four games to three. The following season, they represented Canada at the Ice Hockey World Championships, in Czechoslovakia winning the gold medal at the 1959 World Championship.  The team won eight of nine games, including a final-round match versus the Soviet Union.  Their only loss at the event came on the last day of the tournament versus the host Czechs when they already had first place clinched.

Games were broadcast on CJBQ radio by Jack Devine, including the world championship game in Prague.

The team name was revived by a later team in the Eastern Ontario Senior Hockey League from 2003 to 2006, known as the Belleville Macs.

NHL alumni
Fifteen alumni of the McFarlands also played professionally in the National Hockey League.

1959 roster
 Gordie Bell, Maurice Benoit, Red Berenson, Denis Boucher, Barton Bradley, Wayne Brown, Pete Conacher, Floyd Crawford, Al Dewsbury, Marv Edwards, Ike Hildebrand, Jean Lamirande, John McLellan, Jean-Paul Payette, Lou Smrke

Season-by-season results
Ontario Hockey Association regular season competition results.

References

External links
 The Story of the 1959 World Champion Belleville McFarlands
 The Belleville McFarlands - 50 years later

Defunct ice hockey teams in Canada
Ice hockey teams in Ontario
Sport in Belleville, Ontario
Ice hockey teams representing Canada internationally